South District is a district home to 121,133 people located in Tainan, Taiwan.

History
In February 2002, Qingquan Village and Longgang Village were combined to be Kunni Village; Songshan Village and Nanshan Village were merged into Songan Village; Zhonghe Village, Juexin Village and Haifeng Village were merged into Yongning Village; Nandu Village was divided into Nandu Village and Nanhua Village. In February 2006, Xingzhong Village was merged into Mingde Village, bringing the total villages in the district to become 39.

Geography

 Population: 125,734 (January 2016)
 Area: 28.0383 km2

Administrative divisions
The map of division of South District.

Tourist attractions
 Blueprint Culture and Creative Park
 Tainan City Hakka Assembly Hall of Culture
 Tainan Municipal Baseball Stadium

Education
 Senior High School
 National Tainan Commercial Vocational Senior High School
 Tainan Municipal Nan-Ning Senior High School
 Liu-Sin Senior High School
 Asia Senior Hospitality Vocational School
 Junior High School
 Tainan Municipal Da-Cheng Junior High School
 The junior high school branch of Tainan Municipal Nan-Ning Senior High School
 Tainan Municipal Xin-Xing Senior High School
 Elementary School
 Tainan Municipal Xin-Xing Elementary School
 Tainan Municipal Sheng-Gong Elementary School
 Tainan Municipal Yong-Hua Elementary School
 Tainan Municipal Xi-Shu Elementary School
 Tainan Municipal Long-Gang Elementary School
 Tainan Municipal Zi-Kai Elementary School
 Tainan Municipal Ri-Xin Elementary School

Transportation

Air
The district houses the Tainan Airport.

Roads
The district is connected to Guanmiao District through Provincial Highway 86.

See also
 Tainan

References

External links

  

Districts of Tainan